Sea Patrol is an Australian television drama that ran from 2007 to 2011, set on board HMAS Hammersley, a fictional patrol boat of the Royal Australian Navy (RAN). The series focused on the ship and the lives of its crew members.

Despite similarities in setting and content, this series is not a follow-on to the 1979 series, Patrol Boat.

The first season debuted on 5 July 2007 on the Nine Network, who invested $15 million into the programme. The second season of Sea Patrol, titled Sea Patrol II: The Coup, aired in 2008, while the third season, Sea Patrol: Red Gold, aired in 2009. The fourth season aired in 2010 in a new 16-episode format, with no main theme or continuous storyline running throughout, unlike the first three seasons.

The fifth season of Sea Patrol, "Damage Control", began airing in 2011 and consisted of 13 episodes. The Nine Network has confirmed that this was to be the final season, due to reliance on government rebates that expire after 65 episodes. Completion of season five brought the total episode count to 68 episodes.

Premise
All seasons of Sea Patrol have consisted of standalone episodes dealing with serious breaches of Australian law, such as illegal fishing, asylum seekers and other problems the RAN encounter on typical patrols. The premiere of each season usually introduces a larger event which is expanded on and connected as the season goes on, before being resolved in the finale. This format, however, with a storyline running throughout the season, was absent in season 4.

The first season's premiere began with the introduction of Bright Island, which was positioned as a type of mystery island, and the death of a marine biologist. Over the duration of the season, the CO and some of the crew became suspicious and later entwined in a conspiracy involving water containing a deadly toxin.

The second season, known as Sea Patrol II: The Coup, revolved around insurgents on the fictional Samaru Islands attempting to overthrow the current government, and a group of Eastern European mercenaries and smugglers who near-fatally stabbed Charge, tried to kill XO and are in cahoots with the insurgents and Samaruan constabulary.

The third season, known as Sea Patrol III: Red Gold, began with the death of Josh "ET" Holiday, fiancé of Nicole "Nikki" (Nav) Caetano and a crew member of HMAS Hammersley during the first two seasons. The investigation of this death ran throughout the season.

The fourth season, known as Sea Patrol IV: The Right Stuff, returned with most principal cast members, with the exception of Pete "Buffer" Tomaszewski, Nicole "Nikki" (Nav) Caetano, Billy "Spider" Webb and Commander Steven 'Steve' Marshall.

The fifth season, known as Sea Patrol V: Damage Control, was the final season and began with a suicide bombing in an overseas bar.

Cast and characters

Main cast

Recurring cast

Production

Origins
"Every hour of every day in all weathers young men and women of the Royal Australian Navy Patrol Boat Service battle the elements and the odds to defend Australia's borders and enforce its economic zone. They provide security, support, and relief for the world's largest island..". Each episode of Sea Patrol, from the third season begins with the words "Honour – Honesty – Courage – Integrity – Loyalty", which are the Royal Australian Navy Values.

This series shows the gender and cultural diversity of the Navy, and deals with contemporary issues such as illegal fishing, boat people, drug-running, immigration, and people-smuggling, and have an underlying mystery that runs throughout the series.

Ships

For the first season of Sea Patrol, the fictional HMAS Hammersley (PTF 202) was portrayed by two real s:  was used for filming in Sydney, while  was used for six weeks of filming off Dunk Island in Queensland. Hammersley serves under the fictional naval command structure of "NAVCOM", and was decommissioned during the final episode of the first season. HMAS Kingston (PTF 205), a second fictional Fremantle-class boat, is mentioned in several episodes and appears in the ninth episode: Kingston shares her pennant number with real patrol boat .

When the first season was being filmed, it was predicted that later seasons would replace Hammersley with the newer . Subsequent seasons have used an Armidale class ship, also named HMAS Hammersley, with the hull number 82. For Season 2, footage from two ships was conflated to represent Hammersley: 42 of the 86 days of the series filming were spent aboard , with later pick-up filming aboard .

Locations
 Cairns, Queensland
Gold Coast Convention and Exhibition Centre, Broadbeach, Queensland
 HMAS Waterhen, Navy Base, Sydney, New South Wales
 Dunk Island, Queensland
 Mission Beach, Queensland
 Cowley Beach, near Innisfail, Queensland
 Tamborine Mountain, Queensland
 Tumbulgum, New South Wales
 HMAS Penguin

Episodes

Reception
Before Sea Patrol aired, it was one of the most highly anticipated programmes in Australia, partly due to the episode budget of over A$1 million, twice that of other Australian dramas. Sea Patrol also marked the return of Lisa McCune to television acting.

Sea Patrol received mixed but generally positive reviews. The first season received an average 1.5 million viewers, which dropped during the early part of season two before returning to 1.5 million viewers for the final five episodes.

Marieke Hardy, for The Age, commented "I don't really get Sea Patrol... the general gist of it leaves me somewhat cold", and further claimed that the scripts were not well written and that the actors were not given the opportunity to shine.

Michelle Over, a reviewer for militarypeople.com.au, scored the first episode a disappointing 6.5 out of 10. Over also predicted that the series would begin jumping the shark at episode 5, primarily due to a lack of quality scripts and an unlikeness to the real life of a Navy officer.

Shortly after the series began, the Royal Australian Navy created "The Real Sea Patrol", an interactive website about the activities and personnel on board the Australian patrol boat , designed as a promotional and recruiting tool to capitalise on the series.

Awards and nominations

Logie Awards

Media information

Broadcast history

DVD releases

Internet download 
From 1 April 2008, full episodes of Sea Patrol were offered as free download, as part of ninemsn's catch-up TV service. This download required a third-party player, advertisements were contained in the downloaded files, and the episodes were programmed to be unplayable after the season finished airing.  Due to geo-locational IP blocking, the ninemsn service may not be available outside Australia.

The second season of Sea Patrol was released on the Australian iTunes Store on 25 June 2008.

The first season of Sea Patrol was made available in the United States on the streaming video website Hulu in 2009 and the second season was made available in 2012 .
In early January 2013, season 3, 4, & 5 was released on Hulu.

As of 2021, all episodes are available on the Nine Now streaming service. As of 2023, all episodes are available on Tubi and the Roku Channel in the United States.

International distribution
According to an April 2007 Nine Network press release, international rights to the series "in over 100 territories" were sold to Sparrowhawk Media by Nine Network's international distribution representative, Portman Film and Television. This deal gave Sea Patrol the ability to be seen on various international versions of the Hallmark Channel. As a part of this initial deal, either one or both of the first two seasons of Sea Patrol were seen on Hallmark Channels in many territories throughout the world. Some of the 61 countries in which these early seasons aired on Hallmark included: the United Kingdom, Serbia, Belgium, Indonesia, India, Russia, Italy, South Africa, Mexico, Vietnam, and Palau. In Germany, the series aired since 2011 on Das Vierte. And since 2014 on the new channel Ebru TV.

Later in 2007, NBC Universal Global Networks bought Sparrowhawk. In 2008, NBC Universal Global Networks extended its inherited commitment to Sea Patrol by purchasing series three of the program from Digital Rights Group, a  subsidiary of Portman. Despite being a US-based company, as of 2009, NBC Universal is yet to broadcast the series in the United States. Instead, Sea Patrol has had limited availability in America through the broadband provider Hulu, arranged directly by Digital Rights Group, and on the Roku Channel.

International markets

References

External links
 Sea Patrol at the Australian Television Information Archive
 
 
 Sea Patrol – "Cometh the Hour" at Australian Screen Online

 
Nine Network original programming
Australian drama television series
Australian military television series
Television shows set in Queensland
Television shows set in New South Wales
2007 Australian television series debuts
2011 Australian television series endings
English-language television shows